The Algerian Women's Union (UFA) is a women's organization in Algeria, founded in 1943. 

The women's movement in Algeria originated in the liberation movement from French colonialism in the 1940s, when women were mobilised in the struggle and integrated in the political system. The two pioneer women's groups were Algerian Women's Union (UFA), which was affiliated with the Algerian Communist Party (PCA), and the Association of Algerian Muslim Women (AFMA), founded in 1947 to mobilise women in support of political prisoners and their families. 

The two women's groups both offered a more public role for women, which made it possible for them to leave traditional seclusion and participate in public life, but the contrasted from each other. The UFA included many women in all levels of Algerian Communist Party, who advocated equality between men and women, both educational professional and political, while the AFMA mobilised women as well as men in the struggle from French colonialism, but expected women to step back from public life once independence from France had been won.

References 

Feminist organizations in Africa
Organizations established in 1943
Social history of Algeria
Women's rights in Algeria
1940s in Algeria
Women's organisations based in Algeria